Safety is the third solo album by King's X guitarist Ty Tabor, released in 2002. All songs were written, recorded, and mastered by Tabor at Alien Beans Studios in Katy, TX.

Track listing
Tulip (Your Eyes)
Better To Be On Hold
Missing Love
Funeral
Room For Me
Safety
True Love
Now I Am
Anger
I Don't Mind

Personnel
Ty Tabor - vocals, all guitars, bass, and loop programming.
Jerry Gaskill - drums on tracks 2, 3, 4, 5, 7, 9, and 10.
Christian Nesmith - backing vocals on tracks 7 and 10.
Wally Farkas - "weird guitars" and solo on track 10

2002 albums
Ty Tabor albums
Metal Blade Records albums